The Kelkar Education Trust's Vinayak Ganesh Vaze College of Arts, Science & Commerce (Autonomous) (more commonly known as Kelkar College or Vaze College), is a Mumbai University affiliated college located in Mulund East, Mumbai. The college was established by the Kelkar Education Trust in 1984 in memory of its founder trustee, late Shri. Govind Damodar Vaze.

History
Bhausaheb Kelkar was an industrialist who manufactured fragrances. He had been promoting educational activities through donations to institutions and grants to underprivileged students. A  Kelkar Education Trust was set up by Bhausaheb in Mulund in 1979 to start a college. Kelkar College was started by the Kelkar-Vaze family in the year 1984. The college managed to get affiliation from University of Mumbai soon and is the youngest college to get permanent affiliation from the university of Mumbai.

Location 
It is located at Mithagar area of Mulund East, a northeastern suburb of Mumbai. Surrounded by lush green mangroves on three sides. College is at 15 minutes walk-able distance from Mulund Railway station.

Affiliation and accreditation 
The college is permanently affiliated to the University of Mumbai since 1990. It was also later recognized by UGC (University grants commission).

Kelkar College is the first affiliated Arts, Science and Commerce institution in the state of Maharashtra which was assessed for accreditation by National Assessment and Accreditation Council (NAAC), which the institution of UGC had started. College received five star status in 1998, reassessed in 2005 and assessed for third cycle in 2012 (Third time) with an "A" grade from NAAC.

V.G. Vaze College was granted Autonomy in 2020.

Extra curricular activities 
Cultural Committee
Theatre Wing Veethee Vaze Rangakarmi
Marathi Bhasha and Vangmay Mandal
NSS Unit
Dhruva Sanskrut Mahotsav 
CINELITT (Cinema and Literature Club)
English Literary Association
Vaze Centre for Talent Search

Courses 
The college offers various professional courses, Post graduate programs, and advanced diploma under the dual degree program.
PhD: economics, zoology, chemistry, botany, life sciences
PG programmes: PG by research in botany, zoology, chemistry
PG by papers in zoology, chemistry, MSc IT, MSc biotech
UG degree: commerce, arts and science. In all 122 subject combinations.
Self-financing collaborative programme: post graduate diploma in perfumery and cosmetic management

Students' Council 
As per section 40 (2)(b) of Maharashtra University Act, 1994, the college has set up a body of 22 nominated students, on behalf of all the students of the college, to represent various classes and disciplines.

Festival 
The college hosts an inter college festival named "Dimensions". It generally takes place during the month of December/January every year. Every year a theme is chosen, and accordingly the fest revolves around it.

Notable alumni 
Rucha Hasabnis, Hindi television actress 
Yukta Mookhey, Miss World 1999
Tejashree Pradhan, Marathi television actress
Manasi Salvi, Hindi television actress
Ajinkya Rahane, Indian cricketer
Prajakta Koli, YouTuber and blogger
 Mayuri Wagh, Marathi television actress
 Rashmi Thackeray, Editor of Saamna & wife of Uddhav Thackeray

See also
 University of Mumbai

References

External links
 Kelkar College Official website
 Prospectus of College

Universities and colleges in Mumbai
Colleges in India
1984 establishments in Maharashtra
Educational institutions established in 1984